Matarani is a port city in Arequipa Region, Peru. It is a major port on the southern coast of Peru. The port is operated by Tisur.

See also 
 PeruRail which starts here.

External links
 Official Website

Populated places in the Arequipa Region
Port cities in Peru